Out is an American LGBTQ news, fashion, entertainment, and lifestyle magazine, with the highest circulation of any LGBTQ monthly publication in the United States. It presents itself in an editorial manner similar to Details, Esquire, and GQ. Out was owned by Robert Hardman of Boston, its original investor, until 2000, when he sold it to LPI Media, which was later acquired by PlanetOut Inc. In 2008, PlanetOut Inc. sold LPI Media to Regent Entertainment Media, Inc., a division of Here Media, which also owns Here TV. In 2017, Here Media sold its magazine operations to a group led by Oreva Capital, who renamed the parent company Pride Media. On June 9th, 2022 Pride Media was acquired by Equal Entertainment LLC known as equalpride putting the famous magazine back under queer ownership. 

The Out100 is their annual list of the most "impactful and influential LGBTQ+ people".

History
Out was founded by Michael Goff in 1992 as editor in chief and president. The executive editor was Sarah Pettit (since deceased). In 1996, owner Robert Hardman fired Goff and hired Henry E. (Hank) Scott, a former New York Times Co. executive, as president of Out Publishing Inc., with the charge to rescue the financially troubled magazine company. When Scott joined Out, the company had annual revenues of less than $4 million and expenses of $7 million. Scott changed Out LGBT focus, arguing that gay men and lesbians had little in common other than political and legal issues. He fired Pettit and hired James Collard, editor of Attitude, a gay magazine published in the U.K., to refocus Out on an affluent and style-conscious gay male audience. Audited circulation grew by 67 percent to over 130,000 and the household income of the average Out reader, as measured by MRI, grew from $70,000 a year to $90,000 a year. With the help of Lou Fabrizio, a senior advertising executive whom Scott hired from The New York Times, Out began attracting major fashion advertisers and brands such as Saturn, which previously had not advertised in gay publications. Three years after Scott took control of Out, it had tripled its revenue and become the largest-circulation gay magazine in U.S. history. Those changes positioned the publication for a sale by Hardman to LPI Media in 2000.

In 2001 the circulation was 100,000. Judy Wieder, who was the first female editor in chief of The Advocate, became the first female editorial director of Out. By 2006, when the magazine was acquired by PlanetOut, Out circulation had reached 130,000. Out attracted international attention when it published its debut Power Issue in May 2007, with a cover that featured two models wearing masks of journalist Anderson Cooper and actor Jodie Foster above the cover line, "The Glass Closet". Some lesbians have criticized Out for primarily focusing on gay men. A writer for the website After Ellen noted that in 2008, no lesbians were featured on the magazine's cover, and that only 22% of the persons featured in the Out100 were lesbians.

In 2008, Out, along with its sister publication The Advocate, was purchased by Here Media Inc. Since acquiring the brand, Here Media has expanded the magazine's web presence, OUT.com, and added a mobile application.

On April 18, 2012, it was announced that a newly formed company, Grand Editorial, would oversee the editorial content of Out as a contractor for Here Media. Out editor-in-chief Aaron Hicklin founded Grand. Although the in-house editorial department was eliminated, Hicklin said that he would hire most of the editorial staff back as contracted freelancers.

In 2013, Here Media and Out hosted the 19th annual OUT100 event in New York City at Terminal 5. The annual event celebrates the compelling people who have had a hand in moving forward LGBT rights. Out introduced a Reader's Choice Award in 2013 in addition to its editorially curated list of the top 100 honorees.

In 2017, Here Media sold its magazine operations to a group led by Oreva Capital, who renamed the parent company Pride Media.

On August 2, 2018, Hicklin announced that he would be stepping down after 12 years as editor-in-chief. R. Kurt Osenlund, the magazine's managing editor since March 2014, assumed the role of executive editor and acting editor-in-chief for one issue.

On August 23, 2018, Phillip Picardi was announced as the next editor-in-chief. Despite editorial changes, the parent company and magazine were still rife with financial issues and frequent complaints from freelancers and contract employees. Picardi left Out in December 2019, announcing his abrupt departure via Twitter.

In December 2018, Raquel Willis was appointed as executive editor, becoming the first trans woman to take on a leadership position at the publication. While at Out, Willis won a GLAAD Media Award for Outstanding Magazine Article for "The Trans Obituaries Project".

In September 2020, David Artavia was appointed as the magazine's new editor-in-chief. On January 17, 2020 Diane Anderson-Minshall was named CEO of Pride Media and later that year became the editorial director of OUT.

On June 9th, 2022 after OUT acquisition, Mark Berryhill was named CEO of equalpride. Joe Lovejoy is CFO and Mike Kelley is President of Global Growth and Development. Diane Anderson-Minshall is now the Global Chief Content Creator.

Non-payment controversy

In February 2019, Women's Wear Daily reported that more than forty contributors wrote an open letter to Pride Media and Oreva Capital, its operating entity, as well as its former editorial management partners Grand Editorial and McCarthy LLC, demanding payment for past work. They filed a nonpayment grievance via the National Writers Union. "The National Writers Union is now representing 25 freelance contributors to Out magazine, who are owed more than $40,000 for work that was contracted, produced and published," the union said in a statement. The New York Times detailed the nonpayment issues and that the total owed was in excess of $100,000. The New York Post reported Pride Media owed more than $100,000 in unpaid ad commissions to PinkNews, a London-based digital publisher catering to the global LGBT audience.

Other controversies 
In 2018, it was reported that Adam Levin, the owner of Oreva Capital, the parent company of Pride Media, had a history of donating to Republican politicians who have publicly taken anti-LGBTQ stances, including Devin Nunes, Dean Heller, Josh Mandel, and Dana Rohrabacher. Rohrabacher has said that gay people should be denied the right to buy a home and has consistently opposed legal advancements for the LGBTQ community.

In 2020, OpenSecrets showed additional donations of $2,800 each to Thom Tillis and Steve Daines. Both senators received a zero on the Human Rights Campaign's congressional scorecard for not supporting legislation such as the Equality Act and have voted to confirm anti-LGBTQ judges and cabinet members. The Charlotte Observer's editorial board wrote an article in 2019 called "Thom Tillis is no friend of the LGBTQ community".

Out100 
Since its beginning, Out offered an annual list, the Out100, documenting a hundred "influential, inspirational" LGBTQ personalities and celebrities and "founded to celebrate and honor some of the most influential LGBTQIA figures." In conjunction with the listings is the annual Out100 Awards honoring a handful of that year's celebrities with: Ingenue of the Year, Reader's Choice, Artist of the Year, and Entertainer of the Year. In 2019, editor Phillip Picardi said the Out100 was the magazine's "greatest and most well-known tradition".

Notable contributors

Celebrities on the cover

Graham Ackerman (August 2005)
Adele (June/July 2011)
Christina Aguilera (June/July 2010)
Jason Alexander (April 1997)
Pedro Almodóvar (May 1994)
Jennifer Aniston (April 1998)
David Arquette (October 1996)
Billie Joe Armstrong (April 2010)
Penn Badgley (March 2008)
Jamie Bamber (August 2006)
Javier Bardem (February 2001 and April 2009)
Roseanne Barr (February 1996)
John Barrowman (October 2007)
Bryan Batt (December 2007)
Nate Berkus (December 2005, August 2007 and December 2010/January 2011)
Sandra Bernhard (September 1994 and November 1998)
Beyoncé (May 2014)
Dustin Lance Black (October 2011)
Matt Bomer (June/July 2014)
Justin Vivian Bond (May 2011)
David Bowie (April 2013)
Bill Brochtrup (November 2001)
Thom Browne (December 2007)
David Burtka (January/February 2012)
Charles Busch (October 2003)
Christian Campbell (July 1999)
Carlson Twins (May 2001)
Chris Carmack (February 2005)
Cher (May 2002)
Margaret Cho (June 2002)
Glenn Close (February 1995)
Ben Cohen (August 2011)
Sacha Baron Cohen (August 2009)
Chris Colfer (December 2009 and January 2010)
Chace Crawford (March 2008)
Darren Criss (March 2011)
Billy Crudup (October 2004)
Benedict Cumberbatch (November 2014) 
Alan Cumming (November 1999)
Julie Cypher (June 1996)
Lee Daniels (December 2013) 
Angela Davis (February 1998)
Ellen DeGeneres (May 1997 and February 2004)
Lea DeLaria (March 1998)
Portia de Rossi (May 2013)
Marlene Dietrich (March 1997)
Beth Ditto (May 2009)
Stephen Dorff (April 1996)
Jamie Dornan (November 2006)
Clea DuVall (July 2000)
Melissa Etheridge (June 1996 and August 2002)
Rupert Everett (Fall 1992) 
Jack Falahee (March 2015) 
Jesse Tyler Ferguson (May 2010 and December 2011)
America Ferrera (April 2007)
Harvey Fierstein (October 1994)
Tom Ford (December 2004, November 2007 and February 2011)
James Franco (October 2008)
Dolce & Gabbana (September 2000)
Lady Gaga (September 2009)
Rudy Galindo (August 1996)
Sandy Gallin (November 1994)
David Gandy (February 2015) 
Robert Gant (April 2004)
Jean Paul Gaultier (March 2002 and April 2012)
Boy George (December 2012/January 2013)
Thomas Gibson (August 2000)
Newt Gingrich (March 1995)
Joseph Gordon-Levitt (October 2013)
Kathy Griffin (December 2011)
Jonathan Groff (February 2014 and December 2017/January 2018) 
Jake Gyllenhaal (October 2005)
Alyson Hannigan (August 2001)
Kit Harington (June 2015)
Gale Harold (December 2000)
Woody Harrelson (February 1997)
Neil Patrick Harris (September 2008, January/February 2012 and April 2014)
Randy Harrison (December 2000)
Debbie Harry (June 1999)
Anne Hathaway (December 2006)
Sophie B. Hawkins (May 1995)
Anne Heche (June 1998)
Chris Hemsworth (May 2012)
Paris Hilton (June 2006)
Nicholas Hoult (November 2009)
Whitney Houston (May 2000)
Jennifer Hudson (December 2007)
Josh Hutcherson (November 2013)
Devonté Hynes (March 2014)
Iman (December 2006)
Max Irons (April 2015) 
Michael Irvin (August 2011)
Cheyenne Jackson (December 2008/January 2009 and November 2010)
Marc Jacobs (July 2003 and September 2007)
Mick Jagger (November 1997)
Rob James-Collier (February 2013) 
Dwayne Johnson (March 2005)
Philip Johnson (May 1996)
Bill T. Jones (December 2007)
Jack Kerouac (August 1998)
Chris Kluwe (November 2012) 
Johnny Knoxville (September 2006)
Norman Korpi (July 2001)
Michael Kors (December 2006)
Larry Kramer (December 2011)
Ricki Lake (June 1995)
Adam Lambert (December 2009/January 2010 and August 2015)
Nathan Lane (March 1996 and April 2001)
k.d. lang (December 1995/January 1996 and August 1997)
Cyndi Lauper (December 2009/January 2010)
John Leguizamo (September 1995)
Logan Lerman (September 2012)
Jared Leto (September 2004)
Adam Levine (September 2011)
Freddie Ljungberg (August 2004)
Greg Louganis (April 1995)
Matt Lucas (October 2008)
Jane Lynch (December 2012/January 2013)
Natasha Lyonne (July 2000)
Eric Mabius (April 2007)
Rachel Maddow (December 2010)
Madonna (April 2006)
Joe Manganiello (March 2012)
James Marsden (September 2013)
Rob Marshall (December 2009/January 2010)
Jesse L. Martin (September 2005)
Ricky Martin (December 2010/January 2011)
James McAvoy (September 2014)
Eric McCormack (November 2000)
Ryan McGinley (October 2011)
Ewan McGregor (April 2003 and March 2010)
Ian McKellen (September 1993 and October 1998)
Shane Meier (October 2001)
Christopher Meloni (June 2000)
Mika (July 2007)
Nicki Minaj (October 2010)
Ezra Miller (September 2012)
Wentworth Miller (December 2013)
Liza Minnelli (August 1994)
Kylie Minogue (August 2010)
Jerry Mitchell (October 2000)
John Cameron Mitchell (December 2006)
Shay Mitchell (June 2013)
Julianne Moore (December 1998, December 2010 and October 2015)
Megan Mullally (January 2003)
Ryan Murphy (May 2013)
Martina Navratilova (December 1994/January 1995)
Me'shell Ndegeocello (July 1996)
Sharon Needles (December 2012/January 2013)
Bebe Neuwirth (June 1997)
Barack Obama (December 2015)
Todd Oldham (May 1999 and November 2004)
Elliot Page (December 2014 and October 2015) 
Peter Paige (June 2002)
Mary-Louise Parker (December 2007)
Jim Parsons (December 2013) 
Dolly Parton (July 1997)
Guy Pearce (February 2007)
Andreja Pejic (December 2011)
Katy Perry (December 2008/January 2009)
Pet Shop Boys (January 2000 and June/July 2009)
Joaquin Phoenix (March 1999)
Chris Pine (June/July 2013)
John Paul Pitoc (July 1999)
Parker Posey (February 1999)
Ben Price (July 2006)
Jason Priestley (October 2003) 
James Purefoy (January 2007)
Zachary Quinto (October 2012 and December 2014)
Daniel Radcliffe (September 2010 and March 2013)
Andrew Rannells (December 2012/January 2013)
Eddie Redmayne (September 2015)
Keanu Reeves (July/August 1995)
Danny Roberts (July 2001)
Robbie Rogers (August 2013)
Olivier Rousteing (May 2015) 
Paul Rudd (April 1998)
RuPaul (December 1993/January 1994)
Antonio Sabato Jr. (September 1996)
Mathew St. Patrick (March 2003)
Michael Sam (August 2014)
Andy Samberg (March 2009)
Marcus Schenkenberg (January 2004)
Chloë Sevigny (August 2012)
Jake Shears (April 2005 and October 2006)
Johnny Simmons (September 2012)
Troye Sivan (May 2016)
Alexander Skarsgård (November 2011)
Kerr Smith (March 2001)
Sam Smith (December 2014) 
Wesley Snipes (September 1995)
Sam Sparro (December 2008/January 2009)
Britney Spears (April 2011)
Michael Stipe (November 1995)
Sharon Stone (December 2005)
Hilary Swank (October 1999)
Patrick Swayze (September 1995)
Tilda Swinton (April 2008) 
Wanda Sykes (December 2009/January 2010)
Channing Tatum (February 2002 and June/July 2012)
Lili Taylor (August 1999)
Uma Thurman (November 1993)
Michael Urie (April 2007)
James Van Der Beek (September 2002)
Gus Van Sant (December 2008/January 2009)
Donatella Versace (October 2009)
Gianni Versace (September 1997)
Mark Wahlberg (October 1997)
Rufus Wainwright (January 1999 and December 2006)
David Walliams (October 2008)
Alexander Wang (October 2011)
John Waters (November 2002)
Johnny Weir (December 2010/January 2011)
Pete Wentz (August 2008)
Ed Westwick (March 2008)
Samira Wiley (December 2014) 
Robin Williams (March 1996)
Kevin Zegers (January 2006)
Renée Zellweger (February 2003)
Lil Nas X (August 2021)

References

External links
 Official website

LGBT-related magazines published in the United States
Lifestyle magazines published in the United States
Monthly magazines published in the United States
Magazines established in 1992
1992 establishments in the United States